Boim or Boym, or a romanization of the Yiddish noun בוים ('tree'), is a Yiddish variation of the family name Baum and may refer to:

 Michał Boym (1612–1659), Polish Jesuit
 (1629–1670), Polish Catholic priest, Jesuit , author of theological works 
 Svetlana Boym, Curt Hugo Reisinger Professor of Slavic and Comparative Literatures at Harvard University.
 (born 1965),  Israeli educator
 Ze`ev Boim, Israeli politician

See also 
 Chapel of Boim family

Ashkenazi surnames
Yiddish-language surnames